Michael Dwyers or Michael Dwyers GAA may refer to:
 Michael Dwyers GAA (Wicklow), a juvenile GAA club based in southwest County Wicklow
 Keady Michael Dwyer's GFC, a Gaelic football club in Keady, County Armagh, Northern Ireland
 Michael Dwyer (1772–1825), United Irishmen leader in the 1798 rebellion